The American Physical Society honors members with the designation Fellow for having made significant accomplishments to the field of physics.

The following list includes those fellows selected in the first 50 years of the tradition, that is, from 1921 through 1971.

1921

 N. C. Krishna Aiyar
 Edward Bennett
 Alfred Heinrich Bucherer
 Keivin Burns
 Arthur Jeffrey Dempster
 Paul S. Epstein
 Griffith Conrad Evans
 Kyotuko Fuji
 Frank W. Ham
 Victor Hess
 Joel Henry Hildebrand
 George Wilber Moffitt
 F. H. Norton
 A. H. Patterson
 John K. Robertson
 Joseph Valasek

1922

 William T. Bovie
 Walter F. Colby
 Charles Galton Darwin
 C. J. Davisson
 C. O. Fairchild
 R. L. Hartley
 Thomas C. Hebb
 Raymond Heising
 Mayo Dyer Hersey
 Clarence Wilson Hewlett
 Paul A. Heymans
 G. E. M. Jauncey
 Leonard B. Loeb
 Otto Maass
 G. M. J. Mackey
 F. W. Peek
 Worth Huff Rodebush
 R. B. Sosman
 Leonard Thompson Troland

1923

 James Percy Ault
 Edgar C. Bain
 Robert H. Baker
 C. C. Bidwell
 G. Breit
 Vannevar Bush
 E. A. Eckhardt
 G. Faccioli
 John S. Foster
 Thornton C. Fry
 I. C. Gardner
 George E. Gibson
 Oliver Holmes Gish
 Franklin L. Hunt
 Loyd A. Jones
 David A Keys
 
 John P. Minton
 Francis D. Murnaghan
 Chauncey G. Peters
 Alexander D. Ross
 R. A. Sawyer
 Wilmer Souder
 A. Q. Tool
 Milton S. Van Dusen

1924

 Samuel Etienne Bieler
 Albert Bjorkeson
 I. S. Bowen
 Walter L. Cheney
 K. K. Darrow
 L. A. Hazeltine
 William Stubbs James
 J. H. Van Vleck
 Alan Tower Waterman

1925

 Ernest F. Barker
 William Bowie
 P. Debye
 J. A. Eldridge
 Kanji Honda
 A. Hund
 C. B. Joliffe
 K. H. Kingdon
 Otto Laporte
 Charles F. Meyer
 Robert S. Mulliken
 H. Nagaoka
 H. H. Plaskett
 Charles Sheard
 H. D. Smyth
 John Q. Stewart

1926

 Hugh L. Dryden
 Carl H. Eckhart
 Frederick S. Goucher
 Karl F. Harzfield
 Abraham Joffe
 A. S. McAllister
 Chester Snow
 Frank M. Walters
 Fritz Zwicky
 Nicolas de Kolossowsky

1927

 Samuel K. Allison
 W. Bowie
 F. S. Brackett
 Robert B. Brode
 E. Buckingham
 Elmer Dershem
 O. S. Duffendack
 J. B. Green
 J. J. Hopfield
 H. Hotchkiss
 William V. Houston
 Fabian M. Kannenstine
 Frederick G. Keyes
 B. A. Kreider
 Ralph de L. Kronig
 Samuel C. Lind
 R. B. Owens
 J. Satterley
 F. E. Smith
 I. Stone

1928

 Henry A. Barton
 Joseph A. Becker
 R. M. Bozorth
 F. S. Brackett
 John A. Carroll
 Harry Clark
 Edward Condon
 James M. Cork
 John A Eldridge
 Alexander Ellett
 Marion Eppley
 H. E. Farnsworth
 Alexander Forbes
 Hugo Fricke
 Lester H. Germer
 Alexander Goetz
 E. L. Harrington
 George Harrison
 T. R. Hogness
 Frank C. Hoyt
 Francis A. Jenkins
 J. C. Jensen
 J. B. Johnson
 Charles F. Kettering
 Arthur L. Kimball
 S. M. Kinter
 Charles A. Kraus
 Charles H. Kunsman
 Robert J. Lang
 Ernest O. Lawrence
 George A. Lindsay
 Adolph Lomb
 Alfred L. Loomis
 F. W. Loomis
 Morton Masius
 J. P. Maxfield
 W. H. McCurdy
 George S. Monk
 Jared K. Morse
 Robert A. Patterson
 W. J. Pietenpol
 David C. Prince
 Chester W. Rice
 
 P. A. Ross
 Arthur E. Ruark
 Erwin Schrödinger
 Charles Sheard
 A. G. Shenstone
 John C. Slater
 Joseph Slepian
 Keith K. Smith
 W. W. Stifler
 Louis A. Turner
 Harold C. Urey
 M. S. Vallarta
 Hugo B. Wahlin
 Alan T. Waterman
 E. C. Watson
 William W. Watson
 R. L. Wegel
 Edward C. Wente
 Hermann Weyl
 Charles T. Zahn

1929

 Robert d'Escourt Atkinson
 James A. Beattie
 Arthur Bramley
 L. F. Curtiss
 Joseph W. Ellis
 Gaylord P. Harnwell
 William V. Houston
 Joseph Kaplan
 C. C. Kiess
 Vern O. Knudsen
 Robert B. Lindsay
 Edward Mack, Jr
 Harry B. Maris
 Addams S. McAllister
 Carleton C. Murdock
 Jonas B. Nathanson
 J. R. Oppenheimer
 Thomas H. Osgood
 Hugh S. Taylor
 E. P. T. Tyndall
 John B. Whitehead
 J. W. Williams

1930

 J. Frenkel
 Thomas H. Johnson
 Julian E. Mack
 George F. McEwen
 William Albert Noyes
 Otto Oldenberg
 Chester Snow
 Thomas Spooner
 J. J. Weigle
 Harvey E. White
 John G. Winans
 W. H. Zachariasen

1931

 Fred Allison
 Donald H. Andrews
 Alice H. Armstrong
 Edward J. Baldes
 James H. Bartlett
 Russell S. Bartlett
 J. W. Beams
 J. A. Bearden
 Ralph D. Bennett
 F. Russell Bichowsky
 Francis Bitter
 Oswald Blackwood
 Walker Bleakney
 C. Boeckner
 David G. Bourgin
 Joseph C. Boyce
 Charles J. Brasefield
 A. Keith Brewer
 Ferdinand Brickwedde
 James B. Brinsmade
 W. G. Brombacher
 Detlev W. Bronk
 S. Leroy Brown
 Andrew B. Bryan
 Perry Byerly
 Theodore W. Case
 V. L. Chrisler
 Andrew Christy
 George L. Clark
 Kenneth S. Cole
 J. R. Collins
 Donald Cooksey
 Richard T. Cox
 William H. Crew
 Leo H. Dawson
 David M. Dennison
 Elmer Dershem
 Jane M. Dewey
 G. H. Dieke
 Lee A. DuBridge
 Jesse W. M. DuMond
 Theodore Dunham Jr.
 James M. Eglin
 Frederick E. Fowle
 John G. Frayne
 James B. Friauf
 Nadiashda Galli-Shohat
 William F. Giaque
 George Glockler
 Samuel Goudsmit
 Frank Gray
 Grover R. Greenslade
 Ross Gunn
 Otto Halpern
 William R. Ham
 Arthur C. Hardy
 Robert J. Havighurst
 L. Grant Hector
 Edward L. Hill
 Maurice L. Huggins
 Elmer Hutchinson
 Sydney B. Ingram
 Lewis V. Judson
 J. C. Karcher
 Sebastian Karrer
 E. Lee Kinsey
 Paul Kirkpatrick
 Dewey D. Knowles
 Lewis R. Koller
 Frank C. Kracek
 Victor K. LaMer
 Rudolf Ladenburg
 R. M. Langer
 Karl Lark-Horovitz
 Charles C. Lauritsen
 Victor F. Lenzen
 H. H. Lester
 Noel C. Little
 Walter A. MacNair
 Louis R. Maxwell
 Philip M. Morse
 L. L. Nettleton
 W. W. Nicholas
 J. Rud Nielsen
 Wayne B. Nottingham
 Christian Nusbaum
 Paul S. Olmstead
 A. R. Olpin
 Dimitry H. Olshevsky
 Lars Onsager
 John M. Ort
 Frederic Palmer
 Linus Pauling
 Leo J. Peters
 Shirley L. Quimby
 I. I. Rabi
 Hubert H. Race
 N. Rashevsky
 Edward P. Robertson
 Vladimir Rojansky
 Duane Roller
 Richard Ruedy
 Edward O. Salant
 William Schriever
 A. G. Shenstone
 Francis G. Slack
 William W. Sleator
 Sinclair Smith
 Ambrose H. Stang
 F. W. Stevens
 Ernest C. G. Stuckelberg
 John B. Taylor
 James D. Tear
 Lewi Tonks
 Alva Turner
 M. A. Tuve
 J. T. Tykociner
 George E. Uhlenbeck
 D. S. Villars
 G. R. Wait
 Warren Weaver
 Lars A. Welo
 T. Russell Wilkins
 N. H. Williams
 Robert C. Williamson
 Thomas A. Wilson
 Enos E. Witmer
 Jay W. Woodrow
 Winthrop R. Wright
 Oliver R. Wulf
 Ralph W. G. Wyckoff
 Mark Zemansky
 Otto J. Zobel
 R. V. Zumstein
 Vladimir Zworykin
 Max von Laue

1932

 S. Herbert Anderson
 Richard M. Badger
 Kenneth T. Bainbridge
 Weldon G. Brown
 G. B. Kistiakowsky
 Cornelius Lanczos
 J. E. Lennard-Jones
 Gordon L. Locher
 Harold Pender
 Eugen P. Wigner
 John von Neumann

1933

 Gerald M. Almy
 James H. Bartlett
 Joseph G. Brown
 W. Edwards Deming
 R. T. Dufford
 P. Gerald Kruger
 Harold M. Mott-Smith

1934

 Carl D. Anderson
 R. M. Badger
 Willard H. Bennett
 Paul P. Cioffi
 Halsey A. Frederick
 Louis P. Granath
 Charles D. Hodman
 Reginald L. Jones
 Alfred Lande
 M. Stanley Livingston
 Walter C. Michels
 L. M. Mott-Smith
 Harald H. Nielsen
 M. L. Pool
 R. R. Riesz
 J. E. Shrader
 Shirleigh Silverman
 K. J. Sixtus
 Lloyd P. Smith
 H. F. Stimson
 John Strong
 Lauriston S. Taylor
 Llewellyn H. Thomas
 Robert J. Van de Graaff
 Ernst Wilhelmy

1935

 Arthur J. Aheard
 Robert F. Bacher
 Robert Bowling Barnes
 Hans Bethe
 F. H. Crawford
 John R. Dunning
 Gerald W. Fox
 Enrique Gaviola
 Otto Glasser
 Lawrence R. Hafstad
 J. D. Hanawalt
 James D. Hardy
 Francis E. Haworth
 Malcolm C. Henderson
 John J. Hopfield
 Walter S. Huxford
 M. J. Kelly
 Roy J. Kennedy
 Franz N. D. Kurie
 Edward S. Lamar
 W. Wallace Lozier
 Edwin M. McMillan
 Carl W. Miller
 Harry R. Mimno
 Robert F. Paton
 Gerald L. Pearson
 Earle K. Plyler
 Ernest C. Pollard
 Raymond J. Seeger
 Lewis K. Silicox
 Clinton L. Utterback
 Arthur P. R. Wadlund
 Bertram E. Warren
 Hugh C. Wolfe
 Clarence Zener

1936

 Norman I. Adams
 Mildred Allen
 William P. Allis
 Gladys A. Anslow
 H. Beutler
 N. Henry Black
 Norris E. Bradbury
 Eli Franklin Burton
 Alvin B. Cardwell
 M. F. Crawford
 Paul H. Dike
 C. Drummond Ellis
 Robley D. Evans
 Floyd A. Firestone
 Alfred B. Focke
 Donald D. Foster
 R. H. Fowler
 Nathaniel H. Frank
 Wendell H. Furry
 Lachlan Gilchrist
 H. Grayson-Smith
 Erich Hausmann
 Sterling B. Hendricks
 Frederick V. Hunt
 Dunham Jackson
 Hubert M. James
 Ernest J. Jones
 Hans Mueller
 George M. Murphy
 Henry Victor Neher
 Lothar Nordheim
 John L. Rose
 Jenny E. Rosenthal
 George H. Shortley
 L. B. Slichter
 Leland B. Snoddy
 E. C. Stevenson
 Donald C. Stockbarger
 James D. Stranathan
 Julius A. Stratton
 J. C. Street
 Edward Teller
 Robert N. Varney
 John P. Vinti
 John A. Wheeler
 Ernest O. Wollan
 E. J. Workman
 John C. G. Wulff

1937

 Sidney Walter Barnes
 Preston R. Bassett
 Richard A. Beth
 Felix Bloch
 Emma P. Carr
 Carl T. Chase
 F. Woodbridge Constant
 H. Richard Crane
 Charles S. Fazel
 J. Stuart Foster
 George Gamow
 Arthur Haas
 R. G. Herb
 Gerhard Herzberg
 Herrick L. Johnston
 Edward B. Jordan
 P. Kapitza
 Harold P. Knauss
 Hilario Magliano
 R. C. Mason
 J. C. Mouzon
 Walter M. Nielsen
 Lyman G. Parratt
 Milton S. Plesset
 G. W. Potapenko
 Richard D. Present
 Frederick Seitz
 F. Simon
 Charles P. Smyth
 Harry J. White
 Dudley Williams
 Alfred Wolf

1938

 W. E. Albertson
 J. G. Albright
 Alexander Allen
 Luis Alvarez
 John Bardeen
 E. L. Bowles
 William F. Brown
 J. Franklin Carlson
 R. C. Colwell
 Albert S. Coolidge
 Palmer H. Craig
 Daniel S. Elliott
 Walter B. Ellwood
 Maurice Ewing
 W. A. Fowler
 Walter Gordy
 Eugene Guth
 G. G. Harvey
 Leland J. Haworth
 Joseph E. Henderson
 Clarence N. Hickman
 J. Barton Hong
 Victor E. Lagg
 Willis E. Lamb
 John J. Linvingood
 Frederick B. Llewellyn
 John H. Manley
 Carol G. Montgomery
 D. D. Montgomery
 Rose C. L. Mooney
 A. H. Nielson
 A. O. C. Nier
 Foster C. Nix
 A. Nordsiek
 Melba Phillips
 J. R. Richardson
 Rogers D. Rusk
 John C. Schelleng
 Robert Serber
 Robert S. Shankland
 William Shockley
 William R. Smythe
 John C. Steinberg
 A. F. C. Stevenson
 R. L. Thorton
 J. G. Trump
 L. C. Van Atta
 Karl S. Van Dyke
 Ralph D. Wyckoff
 Jerrold Zacharias

1939

 Allen V. Astin
 Paul L. Bayley
 Katharine Burr Blodgett
 C. Hawley Cartwright
 Ernest E. Charlton
 Jacob Clay
 Gioacchino Failla
 Franco Rasetti
 Enrico Fermi
 James B. Fisk
 Gorton R. Fonda
 Moritz Goldhaber
 Paul M. Gross
 William W. Hansen
 Caryl P. Haskins
 William P. Jesse
 Gleason W. Kenrich
 Emil J. Konopinski
 Sorgo A. Korff
 Donald H. Loughridge
 Millard F. Manning
 Karl W. Moissner
 Henry M. O'Bryan
 Arthur L. Patterson
 Lynn H. Rumbaugh
 Leonard I. Schiff
 Gordon Shrum
 Theodore E. Sterno
 Chauncey G. Suits
 Viktor F Weisskopf
 Milton G. White
 Howell J. Williams
 John H. Williams
 E. Bright Wilson
 Rolland M. Zabel
 Walter H. Zinn
 Stanley N. van Voorhis
 Arthur von Hippel

1940

 Otto Beeck
 J. W. Buchta
 George B. Collins
 Felix Cornuschi
 Peter J. W. Debye
 Richard B. Dow
 Frank G. Dunnington
 Louis A. Gebhard
 Newell S. Gingrich
 Robert E. Holzer
 C. Rulon Jeppesen
 Elbe H. Johnson
 Jerome M. B. Kellogg
 Donald W. Kerst
 Harold J. Kersten
 Harry A. Kirkpatrick
 John G. Kirkwood
 J. K. Knipp
 R. S. Krishnan
 P. Kusch
 Spiro Kyropoulos
 Overton Luhr
 Sidney Millman
 Kenneth R. More
 Lyle W. Phillips
 Norman F. Ramsey
 Howard A. Robinson
 David Sinclair
 Chester M. Van Atta
 Clifford N. Wall
 Robert K. Waring
 Gleb Wataghin
 J. C. M. Whitaker
 Martin D. Whitaker

1941

 Vernon M. Albers
 Herbert L. Anderson
 Paul A. Anderson
 Alfredo Banos
 W. H. Barkas
 Clarence E. Bennett
 L. V. Berkner
 Francis Birch
 John P. Blewett
 T. W. Bonner
 Eugene T. Booth
 Paul L. Copeland
 William E. Danforth
 John P. Delaney
 Lewis A. Delsasso
 Charles S. Draper
 Harold E. Edgerton
 Walter M. Elsasser
 Immanuel Estermann
 Isidor Fankuchen
 Eugene Feenberg
 Ivan A. Getting
 G. Norris Glasoe
 Roy W. Goranson
 Malcolm H. Hebb
 Albert G. Hill
 J. O. Hirschfelder
 J. Warren Horton
 Henry G. Houghton
 Maurice L. Huggins
 Curtis J. Humphreys
 David R. Inglis
 Ellis A. Johnson
 Ralph P. Johnson
 Martin D. Kamen
 Ralph B. Kennard
 George E. Kimball
 R. W. P. King
 Robert Burnett King
 Harry V. Knorr
 James F. Kochlor
 Bernhard Kurrelmeyer
 Lawrence M. Langer
 David B. Langmuir
 L. Jackson Laslett
 Fritz London
 John R. Loufbourow
 Humboldt W. Leverenz
 Louis Malter
 L. Marton
 Maria Goeppert Mayer
 Dana P. Mitchell
 Nora M. Mohler
 Frank E. Myers
 Chaim L. Pekeris
 Boris Podolsky
 W. G. Pollard
 Edith H. Quimby
 Louis N. Ridenour
 Nathan Rosen
 Bruno Rossi
 Philip Rudnick
 Julian Schwinger
 Emilio Segre
 Lincoln G. Smith
 Lyman Spitzer
 Joyce C. Stearns
 Leo Szilard
 Abraham H. Taub
 Browder J. Thompson
 Gregory S. Timoshenko
 Edwin A. Uehling
 Charles W. Ufford
 Lloyd A. Young

1942

 G. Antonoff
 J. M. Blair
 Leon Brillouin
 Frederick R. Hirsh
 C. T. Lane
 L. C. Marshall
 L. Marton
 Philip Rudnick
 R. Smoluchowski

1943

 F. F. Cleveland
 Peter Pringsheim
 Dean Wolldridge

1944

 J. S. Allen
 R. C. Burt
 Andrew Gemant
 James Hillier
 M. L. Huggins
 Andrew W. Lawson
 Egon Lorenz
 J. H. MacMillen
 Herman Francis Mark
 Emil Ott
 W. W. Salisbury
 Hans Staub
 W. E. Stephens
 W. T. Szymanowski
 Gregory Wannier

1945

 Scott Anderson
 Harvey Brooks
 A. E. Caswell
 P. Y. Chou
 C. L. Critchfield
 P. C. Cross
 J. H. Dillon
 Philipp Frank
 G. L. Haller
 R. C. Herman
 K. L. Hertel
 J. A. Hipple
 Montgomery H. Johnson
 C. Lanczos
 J. L. Lawson
 W. J. Lyons
 Melvin Mooney
 Raymond Morgan
 Seth Neddermeyer
 K. A. Norton
 Harry Nyquist
 J. R. Pierce
 G. Plasczck
 N. Rashevsky
 H. J. Reich
 Arthur Roberts
 Ragmar Rollefson
 William E. Shoupp
 Sidney Siegel
 A. J. F. Siegert
 Theodore Soller
 N. H. Trytten
 L. A. Wood
 Dorothy Wrinch
 L. M. Young

1946

 H. L. Andrews
 W. N. Arnquist
 E. Scott Barr
 H. H. Barshall
 L. L. Beranek
 W. H. Bostick
 Egon Bretscher
 T. B. Brown
 C. R. Burrows
 W. M. Cady
 Glen D. Camp
 B. Chance
 Ralph J. Christensen
 R. F. Christy
 L. J. Chu
 A. M. Clogston
 E. A. Coomes
 S. M. Dancoff
 J. M. Davies
 R. H. Dicke
 M. Eastham
 H. W. Emmons
 D. H. Ewing
 Richard Feynman
 T. L. Fowler
 Otto Frisch
 Darol Froman
 S. L. Gerhard
 Louis Goldstein
 D. T. Griggs
 Marshall Halloway
 J. Halpern
 
 D. R. Hamilton
 A. O. Hanson
 E. L. Hudspeth
 D. J. Hughes
 W. H. Jordan
 Joseph Keller
 Gilbert W. King
 L. D. P. King
 Urner Liddel
 L. B. Linford
 P. E. Lloyd
 A. Longacre
 E. M. Lyman
 J. L. McKibben
 P. H. Miller
 J. Millman
 M. D. O'Day
 W. H. Pielemeier
 W. M. Preston
 Hugh Richard
 R. D. Richtmeyer
 F. F. Rieke
 B. W. Sargent
 E. G. Schnieder
 E. J. Schremp
 Glenn T. Seaborg
 M. M. Shapiro
 Rubby Sherr
 C. W. Sherwin
 Samuel Silver
 J. A. Simpson
 O. C. Simpson
 W. H. Souder
 Otto Struve
 G. F. Tape
 Richard Taschek
 F. E. Terman
 H. C. Torrey
 G. E. Valley
 Ernst Weber
 A. M. Weinberg
 Royal Weller
 C. A. Whitmer
 R. R. Wilson
 G. J. Young
 Theodore von Kármán

1947

 Marius Bohun-Green
 Lyle Borst
 Ralph Bown
 W. W. Buechner
 N. D. Coggeshall
 Richard Courant
 Harry W. Fulbright
 P. S. Gill
 W. S. Havens
 Shuichi Kusaka
 A. S. Langsdorf
 Dan McLachlan
 E. P. Ney
 D. O. North
 F. W. Preston
 L. J. Rainwater
 T. A. Read
 H. K. Schilling
 
 A. H. Snell
 A. Taylor
 Katharine Way
 W. A. Wildhack

1949

 P. H. Abelson
 G. D. Adams
 E. S. Akeley
 J. G. Aston
 R. A. Becker
 F. J. Belinfante
 P. G. Bergmann
 Ernst Billig
 Ernst Bleuler
 R. H. Bolt
 H. A. Boorse
 D. K. Coles
 H. C. Corben
 E. Cruetz
 Maurice Desirant
 Martin Deutsch
 S. S. Dharmatti
 R. B. Duffield
 H. Y. Fan
 Herman Feshbach
 G. H. Fett
 Wolfgang Finkelnburg
 H. M. Foley
 J. G. Fox
 Gertrude Scharff Goldhaber
 C. D. Goodman
 Felix Gutmann
 H. D. Hagstrum
 R. O. Haxby
 R. D. Heidenrich
 Conyers Herring
 E. A. Hiedemann
 R. D. Hill
 J. V. Hughes
 Charles Kittel
 H. W. Koch
 W. E. Kock
 J. S. Koehler
 J. S. Laughlin
 Thomas Lauritsen
 J. W. Liska
 Frank Matossi
 R. J. Maurer
 K. G. McKay
 A. G. Meister
 W. O. Milligan
 G. E. Moore
 E. R. Piore
 K. S. Pitzer
 Henry Primakoff
 R. W. Pringle
 E. M. Pugh
 R. B. T. Roberts
 C. S. Robinson
 F. T. Rogers
 M. E. Rose
 R. G. Sachs
 M. B. Sampson
 A. L. Samuel
 R. D. Sard
 J. N. Shive
 L. S. Skaggs
 C. F. Squire
 A. M. Stone
 R. B. Sutton
 C. H. Townes
 Bernard Waldman
 E. A. Walker
 L. R. Walker
 A. H. White
 M. W. White
 R. G. Wilkinson
 Lincoln Wolfenstein
 Chien-Shiung Wu
 Oleg Yadoff
 H. J. Yearian
 Hideki Yukawa
 Sergio de Benedetti

1950

 R. M. Bowie
 R. G. Breckenridge
 H. S. Brown
 R. J. Cashman
 E. C. Crittenden
 C. T. Elvey
 R. W. Engstrom
 Kasimir Fajans
 B. T. Feld
 L. L. Foldy
 Simon Freed
 R. Frerichs
 E. C. Gregg
 F. L. Hereford
 John J. Hopfield
 D. F. Hornig
 C. E. Mandeville
 Leona Marshall
 David Middleton
 H. A. Oetjen
 L. O. Olsen
 Frank Oppenheimer
 Ray Pepinsky
 D. M. Robinson
 H. W. Russell
 E. F. Shrader
 S. S. Sidhu
 A. L. Skylar
 J. S. Smart
 C. S. Smith
 J. W. Stout
 A. L. Turkevich
 L. C. Yuan

1951

 R. Becker
 W. W. Beeman
 A. E. Benfield
 Seymour Bernstein
 Claude Cherrier
 J. E. Goldman
 S. K. Haynes
 Robert Hofstadter
 C. P. Keim
 R. H. Kent
 D. W. R. McKinley
 Erich Regener
 K. I. Roulston
 C. G. Shull
 William Vick Smith
 B. Vodar
 J. A. van der Akker

1952

 A. L. Bennett
 Walter Betteridge
 F. E. Borgnis
 L. T. Bourland
 F. W. Brown
 C. S. Cook
 J. H. Coon
 J. G. Daunt
 W. L. Davidson
 F. E. Fox
 F. N. Frenkiel
 E. Gerjouy
 Elizabeth R. Graves
 R. E. Hillger
 P. S. Jastram
 H. F. Olson
 G. E. Pake
 M. H. Schrenk
 F. B. Shull
 J. H. Simons
 J. H. Webb
 A. O. Williams

1953

 R. K. Adair
 H. V. Argo
 G. C. Baldwin
 F. D. Bennett
 W. W. Berning
 J. K. Bragg
 H. P. Broida
 S. C. Brown
 K. A. Brueckner
 F. P. Bundy
 J. T. Burwell
 R. K. Cook
 C. D. Coryell
 E. F. Cox
 G. J. Dienes
 W. R. Faust
 J. H. Frazer
 W. R. Fredrickson
 F. L. Friedman
 A. W. Friend
 W. F. Fry
 P. F. Gast
 W. M. Good
 M. A. Greenfield
 A. V. Haeff
 Jane H. Hall
 W. T. Ham
 E. F. Hammel
 Peter Havas
 M. L. Herlin
 B. L. Hicks
 J. P. Howe
 Henry Hurwitz
 C. K. Jen
 Erling Jensen
 R. S. Jessup
 Robert Karplus
 Don Kirkham
 E. H. Krause
 W. L. Kraushaar
 H. W. Lewis
 D. L. Lind
 R. S. Livingston
 J. M. Luttinger
 A. K. Mann
 E. Maxwell
 Andre Mercier
 Nicholas Metropolis
 K. Z. Morgan
 W. W. Mutch
 H. Q. North
 W. E. Ogle
 E. C. Okress
 H. M. Parker
 J. R. Pellam
 W. R. Perret
 G. T. Rado
 W. T. Read
 J. A. Sanderson
 O. H. Schmitt
 R. E. Schreiber
 A. H. Scott
 R. B. Scott
 Leo Seren
 H. S. Sommers
 F. H. Spedding
 R. W. Spence
 R. H. Stockmayer
 C. V. Strain
 M. W. P. Strandberg
 R. W. Thompson
 David Turnbull
 G. H. Vineyard
 K. M. Watson
 T. A. Welton
 F. E. Williams
 R. W. Williams
 R. E. Wilson
 J. R. Winckler
 P. A. Wolff
 Oleg Yadoff
 K. A. Yamakawa
 D. J. Zaffarano
 B. H. Zimm

1954

 E. P. Blizard
 W. L. Brown
 A. D. Callihan
 W. N. English
 William A. Klemperer
 D. N. Kundu
 J. D. Kurbatov
 Kurt Lehovec
 F. K. McGowan
 S. O. Morgan
 S. Pasternack
 L. D. Roberts
 R. P. Shutt
 R. D. Spence
 R. L. Sproull
 R. K. Wangsness

1955

 N. Bloembergen
 M. K. Brachman
 Owen Chamberlain
 R. A. Charpie
 B. L. Cohen
 J. N. Cooper
 C. L. Cowan
 S. H. Dike
 David Feldman
 J. D. Ferry
 L. H. Fisher
 Herbert Friedman
 Ronald Geballe
 A. N. Guthrie
 D. L. Hill
 R. D. Huntoon
 W. D. Knight
 W. B. Kunkel
 J. R. Macdonald
 M. L. Merritt
 D. J. Montgomery
 E. C. Nelson
 G. T. Pelsor
 J. H. Reynolds
 M. A. Ruderman
 W. W. Scanlon
 Arthur Schawlow
 Richard Tousey
 W. W. Van Roosbroeck
 G. L. Weissler
 Chen-Ning Yang
 Alexander Zucker
 Frederic de Hoffmann

1956

 D. E. Alburger
 Rudolf Bechmann
 Hendrik Wade Bode
 R. Bowers
 G. L. Brownell
 C. D. Broyles
 R. H. Bube
 J. M. Burgers
 T. B. Cook
 J. G. Dash
 R. L. Dolecek
 W. K. Ergen
 Ugo Fano
 R. E. Fox
 C. Goldberg
 Max Goodrich
 B. R. Gossick
 S. N. Gupta
 C. D. Hause
 Frank Herman
 P. H. Keesom
 J. S. Levinger
 R. L. Longini
 E. F. Lowry
 A. R. Moore
 E. W. Mueller
 H. T. Nagamatsu
 L. S. Nergaard
 D. C. Peaslee
 J. A. Sauer
 S. A. Schaaf
 F. H. Shelton
 A. Simon
 P. L. Smith
 C. V. Stephenson
 Rohn Truell
 F. A. Valente
 W. D. Walker
 Aaron Wexler
 C. E. Wiegand

1957

 Bernard M. Abraham
 L. T. Aldrich
 R. M. Badger
 William Band
 W. E. Bennett
 C. K. Bockelman
 Lowell M. Bollinger
 J. J. Brady
 E. C. Campbell
 W. B. Cheston
 W. A. Chupka
 J. D. Cobine
 Fritz Coester
 M. Y. Colby
 J. W. Dabbs
 R. N. Dexter
 W. C. Dunlap
 J. E. Evans
 W. M. Fairbank
 D. L. Falkoff
 S. E. Forbush
 A. T. Forrester
 M. H. Foss
 S. S. Friedland
 C. G. B. Garrett
 Nathan Ginsburg
 Leo Goldberg
 A. E. S. Green
 G. K. Groetzinger
 C. L. Hammer
 S. S. Hanna
 J. A. Harvey
 Richard J. Hayden
 W. J. Henderson
 D. C. Hess
 C. T. Hibdon
 Roger H. Hildebrand
 N. M. Hintz
 J. G. Hoffman
 R. E. Holland
 W. F. Hornyak
 V. W. Hughes
 Leon Katz
 Carl Kenty
 Chihiro Kikuchi
 R. H. Kingston
 J. D. Knight
 W. C. Koehler
 P. G. Koontz
 Dieter Kurath
 R. T. Lagemann
 E. E. Lampi
 Benjamin Lax
 I. L. Lebow
 E. G. Linder
 R. E. Meyerott
 Daniel W. Miller
 J. P. Mize
 C. D. Moak
 A. H. Morrish
 J. E. Nafe
 V. A. Nedzel
 Roger G. Newton
 R. E. Norberg
 Theodore B. Novey
 R. D. O'Neal
 G. J. Perlow
 E. W. Pike
 W. G. Proctor
 Sol Raboy
 E. G. Ramberg
 C. A. Reynolds
 J. M. Reynolds
 G. R. Ringo
 Shepard Roberts
 P. A. Rodgers
 Fritz Rohrlich
 Philip Rosen
 M. H. Ross
 W. T. Scott
 C. H. Shaw
 K. L. Sherman
 R. G. Shulman
 S. F. Singer
 R. C. Spencer
 P. H. Stelson
 S. T. Stephenson
 C. P. Swann
 K. R. Symon
 L. C. Teng
 M. M. Ter-Pogossian
 Alvin V. Tollestrup
 Douglas M. Van Patter
 G. M. Volkoff
 A. W. Waltner
 D. T. Warren
 R. T. Webber
 Bernard Weinstock
 P. B. Weisz
 H. L. Welsh
 M. K. Wilkinson
 H. B. Willard
 Herman Yagoda
 Aristid von Grosse

1958

 Harry C. Allen
 Ernest Ambler
 Nicholas G. Anton
 Zoltan L. Bay
 David B. Beard
 Alden B. Bestul
 Robert T. Beyer
 Felix H. Boehm
 Lewis M. Branscomb
 Philip J. Bray
 Gerald E. Brown
 Randall S. Caswell
 Rodney Lee Cool
 Lawrence M. Cranberg
 Raymond Davis
 Vernon H. Dibeler
 Antonio Ferri
 Alan D. Franklin
 Joe L. Franklin
 H. P. R. Frederikse
 Everett G. Fuller
 R. H. Good
 Martin Greenspan
 Evans Hayward
 Raymond W. Hayward
 Charles M. Herzfeld
 John D. Hoffman
 Ralph P. Hudson
 Herbert Jehle
 M. Z. Krzywoblocki
 Herbert Leaderman
 D. E. Mann
 Robert S. Marvin
 A. Turner McPherson
 Robert W. Morse
 Joseph W. Motz
 Irwin Oppenheim
 C. H. Page
 Howard H. Seliger
 Andrew W. Sunyar
 Harold O. Wyckoff
 Jules R. de Launey

1959

 Henri Amar
 Isadore Amdur
 Robert L. Anthony
 Norman Austern
 W. Carlisle Barber
 Charles A. Barnes
 Charles W. Beckett
 Benjamin Bederson
 Stephan Berko
 Lawrence R. Bickford
 Manfred A. Biondi
 Cornelius P. Browne
 Nicolas Cabrera
 Kenneth M. Case
 William Carter Dash
 Thomas M. Donahue
 Samuel N. Foner
 Richard G. Fowler
 Glenn M. Frye
 John L. Gammel
 Donald A. Glaser
 G. Robert Gunther-Mohr
 Paul V. C. Hough
 Lloyd P. Hunter
 Robert Jastrow
 Frederic Keffer
 Karl G. Kessler
 Samuel Krimm
 John J. Lambe
 Rolf W. Landauer
 W. Wallace McCormick
 Thomas R. McGuire
 John A. McIntyre
 A. G. McNish
 Franz R. Metzger
 John W. Mihelich
 Walter C. Miller
 David Mintzer
 Roger Newman
 Hugh C. Paxton
 Arthur V. Phelps
 Robert W. Pidd
 John S. Plaskett
 Walter Ramberg
 Charles A. Randall, Jr
 Alfred G. Redfield
 David J. Rose
 Marshall Rosenbluth
 Mahendra S. Sodha
 John Wescott Stewart
 Robert M. Talley
 Winfield W. Tyler
 Lawrence J. Varnerin
 George P. Wachtell
 Richard F. Wallis
 Satosi Watanabe
 Walter D. Whitehead
 H. G. F. Wilsdorf
 Ralph A. Wolfe
 William E. Wright
 Chia-Shun Yih
 Donald R. Young

1960

 John T. Agnew
 Joseph Ballam
 Richard G. Barnes
 Charles P. Bean
 Lawrence C. Biedenharn
 Joseph L. Birman
 George Birnbaum
 Frank J. Blatt
 Martin M. Block
 Richard C. Bradley
 Ivor Brodie
 James J. Brophy
 Laurie M. Brown
 Charles I. Browne
 Max E. Caspari
 Calvin M. Class
 E. Richard Cohen
 Michael Cohen
 W. Dale Compton
 George A. Cowan
 Donald C. Cronemeyer
 Michael Danos
 Robert B. Day
 B. C. Diven
 Jerome M. Dowling
 Raymond L. Driscoll
 Henry Ehrenreich
 Leo Esaki
 Edgar Everhart
 John C. Fisher
 B. C. Frazer
 Alexander N. Gerritsen
 Leonard Sidney Goodman
 Melvin B. Gottlieb
 Andrew Guthrie
 Thomas M. Hahn
 Marshall C. Harrington
 Edward W. Hart
 Richard L. Henkel
 Julius L. Jackson
 Evan O. Kane
 Werner Kanzig
 Narinder S. Kapany
 William Edward Keller
 Edward Haskel Kerner
 George B. Kistiakowsky
 Bennett Kivel
 Walter Kohn
 F. Ralph Kotter
 William E. Kreger
 Martin D. Kruskal
 Elliott J. Lawton
 Robert B. Leachman
 Tsung-Dao Lee
 Bowen Rado Leonard
 Harold Walter Lewis
 Sidney H. Liebson
 Archie Mahan
 J. Carson Mark
 Robert L. Mather
 Gordon W. McClure
 James W. McGrath
 Hans Meissner
 John Wesley Mitchell
 Ralph C. Mobley
 R. F. Mozley
 Frederick Van Name
 Henry Winston Newson
 G. K. O'Neill
 Vincent E. Parker
 Robert G. Parr
 Joseph E. Perry
 Murray Peshkin
 Gerald C. Phillips
 James Alfred Phillips
 Gerald S. Picus
 David Pines
 Robert L. Platzman
 R. Ronald Rau
 Leonard Reiffel
 Fred Linden Ribe
 Harold E. Rorschach
 Arnold Russek
 Vance L. Sailor
 George J. Schultz
 John D. Seagrave
 Sunil K. Sen
 Kurt E. Shuler
 A. Melvin Skellett
 Stephen J. Smith
 Robert Stratton
 Peter A. Sturrock
 Chan Mou Tehen
 James L. Thomas
 Moody C. Thompson
 Alen M. Thorndike
 Richard E. Trees
 Arthur G. Tweet
 George D. Watkins
 A. B. Weaver
 Joseph Weber
 Joseph Wenesser
 Philip G. Wilkinson
 Robert Marshall Williamson
 Andrew Wittkower
 John L. Yarnell
 Hubert P. Yockey

1961

 Felix T. Adler
 Fay Ajzenberg-Selove
 Frederick G. Allen
 Giulio Ascoli
 Richard G. Barnes
 Douglas S. Billington
 D. Allan Bromley
 Frederick C. Brown
 Richard M. Brown
 Elias Burstein
 Bille C. Carlson
 Kuldip P. Chopra
 Kenneth C. Clark
 Eugene P. Cooper
 James H. Crawford
 Bryce S. DeWitt
 Jerome M. Dowling
 Martin H. Edwards
 Arthur A. Evett
 George Wells Farwell
 George Feher
 Joseph R. Feldmeier
 Wade L. Fite
 Sherman Frankel
 Hans Frauenfelder
 Theodore H. Geballe
 Alexander N. Gerritsen
 Edwin L. Goldwasser
 Leonard S. Goodman
 J. Mayo Greenberg
 Willy Haeberli
 Isaac Halpern
 Frank S. Ham
 Paul Handler
 Wendell G. Holladay
 John Richard Holmes
 J. David Jackson
 Boris A. Jacobsohn
 Ali Javan
 Cleland H. Johnson
 Evan O. Kane
 Paul G. Klemens
 Louis J. Koester
 Ulrich E. Kruse
 James M. Lafferty
 Leo S. Lavatelli
 Sam Legvold
 Alfred Leitner
 Paul Warren Levy
 Theodore Aaron Litovitz
 William Arthur Little
 John S. Luce
 Gerald W. Ludwig
 Archie Mahan
 Dillon E. Mapother
 Robert L. Mather
 David W. McCall
 Harold Mendlowitz
 Kazuhiko Nishijima
 Robert Novick
 Robert H. Parmenter
 David G. Ravenhall
 John M. Richardson
 G. Raymond Satchler
 Richard Schlegel
 Fred H. Schmidt
 John Robert Schrieffer
 Walter Selove
 Richard G. Seyler
 David P. Shoemaker
 Ralph O. Simmons
 William P. Slichter
 James H. Smith
 Stanley Cooper Snowdon
 James N. Snyder
 Charles P. Sonnett
 Rudolph M. Sternheimer
 Roger A. Strehlow
 Clayton A. Swenson
 Robb M. Thomson
 John S. Toll
 John Stewart Waugh
 Alfons Weber
 Joseph Weber
 Max T. Weiss
 John C. Wheatley
 Donald Robertson White
 Henry William Wyld
 Marvin Eugene Wyman

1962

 Edward V. Ashburn
 Masao Atoji
 Robert Avery
 W. O. Baker
 John R. Banister
 S. H. Bauer
 George Bekefi
 George B. Benedek
 Joseph Berkovitz
 Jeremy Bernstein
 R. Bersohn
 Fred W. Billmeyer
 John S. Blair
 M. Bloom
 Stewart D. Bloom
 David Bodansky
 Charles H. Braden
 Thomas H. Braid
 Bertram N. Brockhouse
 Marx Brook
 Solomon J. Buchsbaum
 A. M. Bueche
 F. Bueche
 Frank P. Buff
 Bertram A. Calhoun
 Howard Earl Carr
 Edward F. Casassa
 John G. Castle
 Bellur S. Chandrasekhar
 Robert L. Chasson
 Wolfgang J. Choyke
 Eugene L. Church
 Frederic H. Coensgen
 Stirling A. Colgate
 Eugene P. Cooper
 Lester M. Corliss
 Bryce L. Crawford
 C. F. Curtiss
 Richard H. Dalitz
 Sperry E. Darden
 Norman R. Davidson
 Thomas W. De Witt
 J. C. Decius
 Hans G. Dehmelt
 Joseph F. Dillon
 Malcolm Dole
 Kurt Dressler
 Harry G. Drickamer
 John F. Eichelberger
 Werner S. Emmerich
 Gert Erlich
 Andrew H. Eschenfelder
 Edwin R. Fitzgerald
 Marshall Fixman
 Paul A. Flinn
 Paul J. Flory
 Simon Foner
 Thomas G. Fox
 George K. Fraenkel
 Simeon A. Friedberg
 Edward A. Frieman
 Harold A. Gersch
 Stanley Geschwind
 Julian H. Gibbs
 John B. Goodenough
 Barry S. Gourary
 Harry E. Gove
 Wayland C. Griffith
 G. Richard Grove
 H. S. Gutowsky
 Robert N. Hall
 N. Bruce Hannay
 William R. Haseltine
 Julius M. Hastings
 Louis C. Hebel
 Warren Heckrotte
 F. T. Hedgcock
 J. de Heer
 Ernest M. Henley
 Dudley R. Herschbach
 Nicolas Inchauspe
 Vincent Jaccarino
 Israel S. Jacobs
 Nelson Jarmie
 Howard S. Jarrett
 Peter D. Johnson
 Thomas A. Kaplan
 Allan N. Kaufman
 H. Douglas Keith
 Charles N. Kelber
 Robert W. Keyes
 Robert S. Knox
 George F. Koster
 Leslie S. G. Kovasznay
 William R. Krigbaum
 Arnold M. Kuethe
 John Eugene Kunzler
 Eugene J. Lauer
 Robert D. Lawson
 David R. Lide
 C. C. Lin
 Seymour J. Lindenbaum
 Walter B. Loewenstein
 Conrad L. Longmire
 Jere Johns Lord
 Alexander D. MacDonald
 Hershel Markovitz
 Walter C. Marshall
 Ludwig J. Mayer
 Donald S. McClure
 James W. Meadows
 Clarence R. Mehl
 Arthur Clayton Menius
 R. E. Merrifield
 Eugen Merzbacher
 Frederick John Milford
 Glenn H. Miller
 Marvin H. Mittleman
 Raymond L. Murray
 John R. Neighbours
 A. Wilson Nolle
 Normal Lee Oleson
 Eugene Parker
 Stanford S. Penner
 Martin Peter
 Herbert R. Philipp
 W. D. Phillips
 Gilbert J. Plain
 Alan M. Portis
 Richard F. Post
 Emerson W. Pugh
 Marguerite M. Rogers
 Norman Rostoker
 Klaus Ruedenberg
 Matthew Sands
 Hiroshi Sato
 John P. Schiffer
 Melvin Schwartz
 Arthur Schwarzschild
 Benjamin Segall
 Howard A. Shugart
 John Arol Simpson
 Glen A. Slack
 John C. Slonczewski
 Edward G. Spencer
 Martin Stearns
 Richard S. Stein
 Ernest J. Sternglass
 Thomas H. Stix
 George Sudarshan
 Paul M. Sutton
 Morris Tanenbaum
 George B. Thurston
 George Thomas Trammell
 Douglas Venable
 Ernest K. Warburton
 Sir Robert Watson-Watt
 Gunther K. Wertheim
 Edgar F. Westrum
 Robert L. White
 Lawrence Wilets
 Richard Wilson
 Louis Witten
 L. D. Wyly

1963

 William Parker Alford
 John M. Anderson
 Peter Louis Auer
 George A. Baker
 Samuel Jarvis Bame
 Klaus H. Behrndt
 Converse Herrick Blanchard
 Eugene I. Blount
 Martin Blume
 Dan I. Bolef
 Mark Bolsterli
 Earl R. Callen
 Richard O. Carlson
 Shang-Yi Ch'en
 Leon N. Cooper
 James Watson Cronin
 William Culshaw
 William D. Davis
 John A. Dillon
 Harry Dreicer
 John J. Dropkin
 Marvin Emerson Ebel
 Charles Elbaum
 John R. Eshbach
 Howard W. Etzel
 James M. Ferguson
 Sidney Fernbach
 C. M. Fowler
 Arthur J. Freeman
 Charles J. Gallagher
 Jagadish B. Garg
 John J. Gilvarry
 I. I. Glass
 Maurice Glicksman
 Charles J. Goebel
 Louis Gold
 Herbert Goldstein
 Myron L. Good
 J. Charles Grosskreutz
 Everett Mark Hafner
 Donald Hagerman
 Gordon E. Hansen
 Eugene Helfand
 Heinz K. Henisch
 George Wheeler Hinman
 Clyde A. Hutchinson
 A. R. Hutson
 Suresh Chand Jain
 John A. Jungerman
 Jerome Karle
 George R. Keepin
 V. Paul Kenney
 Marvin E. Lasser
 Boris Leaf
 Bela A. Lengyel
 Leon J. Lidofsky
 Hans W. Liepmann
 Dudley T. F. Marple
 Kenneth B. McAfee
 Edward Melkonian
 Peter A. Moldauer
 Michael J. Moravcsik
 Donald R. Morey
 Henry Motz
 Rolf Karl Mueller
 John A. Northrop
 Susumu Okubo
 Jay Orear
 Richard Keut Osborn
 Lorne A. Page
 Harry Palevsky
 Russell A. Peck
 A. Peterlin
 Richard James Plano
 George W. Pratt
 Jerome S. Prener
 Earl W. Prohofsky
 Warren E. Quinn
 Herbert Rabin
 Arthur H. Rosenfeld
 Herbert B. Rosenstock
 George Rudinger
 Moti L. Rustgi
 Edward I. Salkovitz
 Nicholas P. Samios
 George A. Sawyer
 Raymond F. Sawyer
 Albert I. Schindler
 Guenter Schwartz
 Ruth Fitzmayer Schwarz
 Arthur Schwarzchild
 Anatole M. Shapiro
 Raymond Kay Sheline
 Zaka I. Slawsky
 Bernard Smaller
 Felix T. Smith
 George F. Smith
 David P. Stevenson
 Frank H. Stillinger
 Thomas F. Stratton
 Otmar Michael Stuetzer
 James Terrell
 Otto Theimer
 Sam Bard Treiman
 Thomas L. Weatherly
 Romayne F. Whitmer
 Joel Q. Williams
 William J. Willis
 William W. Wood
 Thomas J. Ypsilantis
 P. F. Zweifel

1964

 Elihu Abrahams
 John D. Anderson
 C. H. Bachman
 Samuel Jarvis Bame
 Saul Barshay
 Earl C. Beaty
 Albert C. Beer
 Ted G. Berlincourt
 Richard Blankenbecler
 Rubin Braunstein
 Robert Melvin Brugger
 Manuel Cardona
 Herman Y. Carr
 Thomas Ripley Carver
 Henderson Cole
 Arthur C. Damask
 David B. Dutton
 Norman Einspruch
 Thomas L. Estle
 James A. Fay
 Val Logsdon Fitch
 Harry Lloyd Frisch
 Philip H. Geil
 Sydney Geltman
 G. W. Gobeli
 George Warren Griffing
 Leonard I. Grossweiner
 Lester Guttman
 Richard A. Hake
 Russell LaVerne Heath
 Kenneth W. Hedberg
 Douglas J. Henderson
 Warren Elliott Henry
 Roland Francis Herbst
 J. Ross Heverly
 Robert M. Hill
 F. Hubbard Horn
 Hans Jaffe
 Robert George Jahn
 Piyare Lal Jain
 Walter John
 William G. Johnston
 William L. Kehl
 Arthur K. Kerman
 Clarence F. Kooi
 Ralph W. Krone
 Murray A. Lampert
 Cecil Eldon Leith
 Aaron Lemonick
 John Linsley
 Alfred U. MacRae
 Edward Allen Mason
 Satish C. Mathur
 F. Albert Matsen
 Ian E. McCarthy
 Hugh McManus
 Henry Lewis McMurry
 Alan L. McWhorter
 Mael A. Melvin
 Roger C. Millikan
 Michael Stanley Moore
 Robert Alexander Naumann
 Richard C. Nelson
 Arthur H. Nethercot
 Theodore George Northrop
 Elio Passaglia
 P. James Peebles
 Charles P. Poole
 Robert H. Rediker
 Charles William Reich
 Ronald M. Rockmore
 Adam F. Schuch
 Lawrence M. Slifkin
 Thor L. Smith
 Peter P. Sorokin
 M. C. Steele
 Alec T. Stewart
 Swaminatha Sundaram
 Dale T. Teaney
 Georges M. Temmer
 David Gilbert Thomas
 Richard N. Thomas
 William W. True
 Arthur Strong Wightman
 Howard A. Wilcox
 Rolf G. Winter
 James P. Wittke
 E. J. Zimmerman

1965

 Hack Arroe
 Dana K. Bailey
 Clarence Franklin Barnett
 Stanley Bashkin
 Robert Thomas Bate
 Richard B. Bernstein
 Jacob Bigeleisen
 John S. Blakemore
 Leon Blitzer
 Edward F. Carome
 W James Carr
 Tien Sun Chang
 Lloyd F. Chase
 Philip Wylie Coulter
 Jack W. Culvahouse
 Arthur C. Damask
 John P. Davidson
 Edward E. Donaldson
 Ronald D. Edge
 Arno Wilford Ewald
 Vincent J. Folen
 Thomas Kenneth Fowler
 Wolfgang Franzen
 Robert J. Friauf
 Fausto G. Fumi
 R. H. Garstang
 W. F. Gauster
 Samuel Dwight Gehman
 Andrew V. Gold
 Paul Goldhammer
 Charles D. Goodman
 Claude G. Grenier
 Gordon E. Gross
 Richard A. Gudmundsen
 John B. Gunn
 Melvyn L. Halbert
 Edward G. Harris
 Mark Harrison
 Marvin Hass
 Eastman N. Hatch
 Gabriel Frederick Herrmann
 J. Ross Heverly
 D. K. Holmes
 John Thomas Howe
 Arthur Huechman
 Richard W. Huggett
 Joseph L. Hunter
 William G. Johnston
 Joyce J. Kaufman
 William L. Kehl
 Seymour P. Keller
 George G. Kelley
 William J. Kerman
 Rappal S. Krishnan
 Behram Kursunolgu
 Norman H. Lazar
 Aleksander Lempicki
 Chun Chia Lin
 Samuel H. Liu
 Ralph A. Logan
 Per-Olov Lowdin
 Herbert Grenfeld MacPherson
 Malcolm H. Macfarlane
 Allan R. Mackintosh
 Hormoz M. Mahmoud
 T. H. Maiman
 Saul Meiboom
 Roy Middleton
 Robert G. Morris
 Marcel W. Muller
 B. A. Munir
 Marshall I. Nathan
 William F. Nelson
 Bishan P. Nigam
 K. Carl Nomura
 Masaru Ogawa
 William C. Overton
 F. J. Padden
 Edward D. Palik
 Edgar A. Pearlstein
 Ronald F. Peierls
 Clive Howe Perry
 Richard L. Petritz
 George C. Pimentel
 Maurice H. L. Pryce
 Derek L. Pursey
 V. K. Rasmussen
 David Redfield
 David M. Ritson
 Radha R. Roy
 L. Worth Seagondollar
 Norman Steven Shiren
 Robert T. Siegel
 Thoma M. Snyder
 Frank Stern
 Ellen S. Stewart
 Robert Stump
 Miroslav Synek
 Stephen Tamor
 Sidney Teitler
 William Tobocman
 Carl Tomizuka
 M. Elaine Toms
 Carroll C. Trail
 Sol Triebwasser
 William J. Turner
 M. S. Wechsler
 S. I. Weissman
 John W. Weymouth
 Kenneth A. Wickersheim
 Clara Johanne Doris Wilsdorf
 Gordon G. Wiseman
 James C. Wu
 F. W. Young

1966

 Leland C. Allen
 Rodney D. Andrews
 Petros N. Argyres
 Hack Arroe
 Arthur Ashkin
 Asim O. Barut
 James H. Becker
 Ira B. Bernstein
 Avadh B. Bhatia
 Leon Blitzer
 Sidney A. Bludman
 Wesley E. Brittin
 Kenneth J. Button
 Richard R. Carlson
 Sydney Chapman
 Charles E. Chase
 Bertran W. Downs
 Gene F. Dresselhaus
 Wiliam E. Drummond
 William P. Dumke
 Ronald K. Eby
 David Olaf Edwards
 Stanley C. Fultz
 Eugene Goldberg
 James P. Gordon
 Roy W. Gould
 Robert A. Gross
 Harold P. Hanson
 N. J. Harrick
 Edward G. Harris
 Bernard G. Harvey
 Robert A. Hein
 Arthur Herschman
 Robert E. Howard
 Darrell S. Hughes
 Julian F. Johnson
 Nicola N. Khuri
 Ernest D. Klema
 Noemie Koller
 Jack J. Kraushaar
 Kenneth Lande
 Donald Newton Langenberg
 Howard J. Laster
 Joel L. Lebowitz
 G. W. Lehman
 Edgar Lipworth
 T. H. Maiman
 Jerry B. Marion
 Hans Mark
 John C. Mavroides
 Osman K. Mawardi
 Jacob Mazur
 John McElhinney
 Siegfried J. Methfessel
 James E. Monahan
 Robert Nathans
 Leo J. Neuringer
 Clayton E. Olsen
 David I. Paul
 Aihud Pevsner
 Sergio P. S. Porto
 Vasant R. Potnis
 Francis W. Prosser
 John J. Quinn
 K. Narahari Rao
 Paul Rappaport
 Herbert Spencer Ribner
 William W. Robertson
 Mykola Saporoschenko
 Richard C. Sapp
 Douglas J. Scalapino
 Engelbert L. Schuking
 Gen Shirane
 Benjamin D. Silverman
 Rolf Sinclair
 Katsumi Tanaka
 Peter E. Tannenwald
 Jerome J. Tiemann
 Arthur Victor Tobolsky
 George L. Trigg
 Roger H. Walmsley
 Benjamin Welber
 Herbert J. Zeiger
 Alfred J. Zmuda
 Frits K. du Pre

1967

 Benjamin Abeles
 Harold M. Agnew
 Ralph D. Amado
 Betsy Ancker-Johnson
 Orson LaMar Anderson
 Leonid V. Azaroff
 Marshall Baker
 George I. Bell
 William R. Bennett Jr.
 Daniel Bershader
 Karl W. Boer
 Rollon O. Bondelid
 Leo Brewer
 Authur A. Broyles
 Rolf Buchdahl
 Gerald Burns
 J. W. Cable
 George D. Cody
 Hans Otto Cohn
 Robert V. Coleman
 James W. Corbett
 Allan M. Cormack
 John M. Dawson
 Warren DeSorbo
 Arwin A. Dougal
 James E. Drummond
 Thomas H. Dupree
 Thomas Erber
 Marc R. Feix
 Richard A. Ferrell
 Richard L. Fork
 James B. Gerhart
 John H. Gibbons
 Joseph A. Girodmaine
 David E. Golden
 Jack S. Greenberg
 Hans R. Griem
 Piet C. Gugelot
 Hershel J. Hausman
 John C. Hensel
 Joseph H. Hirschberg
 Gerald J. Holton
 Richard E. Honig
 David W. Joseph
 Sidney H. Kahana
 Daniel E. Kaplan
 Young B. Kim
 G. C. Knollman
 Walter S. Koski
 J. J. Lander
 Howard J. Laster
 Benjamin W. Lee
 Richard H. Levy
 Don B. Litchenberg
 W. H. T. Loh
 Jere J. Lord
 Richard L. Macklin
 Leon Madansky
 Robert P. Madden
 Meinhard E. Mayer
 Kathryn A. McCarthy
 Dean E. McCumber
 Earl W. McDaniel
 Frank B. McDonald
 Carver A. Mead
 Sydney Meshkov
 Herbert L. Mette
 Walter E. Millett
 Francis J. Morin
 R. B. Murray
 Albert Narath
 Jacques I. Pankove
 Chandra K. N. Patel
 Richard M. Patrick
 Harry E. Petschek
 Sergio P. S. Porto
 John O. Rasmussen
 Robert Resnick
 Martin E. Rickey
 Peter H. Rose
 Gerald Harris Rosen
 Bruce Rosenblum
 Laura M. Roth
 Jack Sandweiss
 Alvin M. Saperstein
 Edwin J. Schillinger
 James E. Schirber
 Richard E. Schmunk
 Jack Schneps
 Alexander G. Smith
 George A. Snow
 Edward Sonder
 William E. Spicer
 George C. Sponsler
 Edward A. Stern
 George W. Stroke
 Hiroshi Suura
 James C. Swihart
 Horace D. Taft
 Jerome J. Tiemann
 Thomas A. Tombrello
 Paul Urban
 Joseph T. Vanderslice
 Duane C. Wallace
 Roger H. Walmsley
 Roy Weinstein
 Richard Williams
 Harvey Winston
 Peter J. Wojtowicz
 Eligius A. Wolicki
 Yako Yafet
 Frederik W. deWette

1968

 Berni J. Alder
 Igor Alexeff
 Roy S. Anderson
 Sigurd Arajs
 Morrel P. Bachynski
 Manoj K. Banerjee
 Michel Baranger
 Lawrence Sims Bartell
 Gilbert Alfred Bartholomew
 George B. Beard
 Abraham Bers
 Robert W. Birge
 James Daniel Bjorken
 Ingram Bloch
 Henry Gabriel Blosser
 Robert R. Borchers
 Werner Brandt
 Harold C. Britt
 Lowell S. Brown
 Oscar Buneman
 Richard A. Chapman
 Francis F. Chen
 Donald Delbert Clayton
 Bernard R. Cooper
 Bruch Cork
 Paul P. Craig
 Richard Edwin Cutkosky
 R. A. Dandl
 Robert H. Davis
 Thomas B. Day
 Malcolm Derrick
 Robert M. Eisberg
 Melvin Eisner
 Bent Elbek
 Herbert Aaron Elion
 Arnold Engler
 Cavid Erginsoy
 Thomas Henry Fields
 Willis H. Flygare
 Vincent J. Folen
 Harold Forstat
 Alan Bicksler Fowler
 Wiliam B. Fowler
 John David Fox
 Daniel R. Frankl
 John Stiles Fraser
 Herbert M. Fried
 M Andre Gallmann
 Aaron I. Galonsky
 Ivar Giaever
 Norman K. Glendenning
 Rolfe E. Glover
 Serge Gorodetzky
 Michael Anthony Grace
 Robert Lockhart Graham
 John M. Greene
 James J. Griffin
 Robert Budington Griffiths
 Donald J. Grove
 Joseph H. Hamilton
 Walter A. Harrison
 Robert D. Hatcher
 Hubert Heffner
 Wilmont N. Hess
 Jay L. Hirshfield
 Harry D. Holmgren
 William Coffeen Holton
 Raymond H. Hughes
 John R. Huizenga
 George J. Igo
 John L. Johnson
 Tudor W. Johnston
 Ernest A. Jones
 Keith W. Jones
 Alfred S. Joseph
 Arthur R. Kantrowitz
 Arnold M. Karo
 Ralph W. Kavanagh
 Emil Kazes
 William H. Kelly
 Leroy T. Kerth
 Ralph W. Kilb
 Gordon S. Kino
 Leonard S. Kisslinger
 Claude A. Klein
 Otto Mogens Kofoed-Hansen
 Nicholas A. Krall
 Aron Kupperman
 Thaddeus F. Kycia
 James Stephen Langer
 Robert Lanou
 Leon M. Lederman
 William W. Lichten
 Paul H. Lindenmeyer
 William H. Louisell
 William M. MacDonald
 S. W. MacDowell
 Rudolph A. Marcus
 Paul C. Martin
 Ronald Lavern Martin
 James E. McCune
 John P. McKelvey
 James E. Mercereau
 Donald H. Miller
 Philip Dixon Miller
 John Charles Douglas Milton
 Charles W. Misner
 Robert K. Nesbet
 Carl R. Oberman
 Tihiro Ohkawa
 Sadao Oneda
 Frank J. Padden
 Paul M. Parker
 Laurence Passell
 George Algis Paulikas
 Stanley J. Pickart
 Dan Q. Posin
 Herman Postma
 Melvin Alexander Preston
 Albert G. Prodell
 Benton Seymour Rabinovitch
 William A. Reed
 Rufus H. Ritchie
 George W. Robinson
 Mark Tabor Robinson
 Lauren Sidney Rodberg
 Charles E. Roos
 Carl Albert Rouse
 Nathan Rynn
 Robert Thornton Schumacher
 Ralph Ernest Segel
 William Arthur Sibley
 Peter S. Signell
 James E. Simmons
 Ronald J. Sladek
 Harold Glenn Smith
 Louis D. Smullin
 Charles M. Sommerfield
 Raymond Andrew Sorensen
 Larry Spruch
 Richard H. Stokes
 H. Henry Strokes
 Joseph Sucher
 Ravindra N. Sudan
 Taro Tamura
 Wiliam B. Thompson
 Edward H. Thorndike
 Derek A. Tidman
 Walter J. Tomasch
 Arnold M. Toxen
 Alvin W. Trivelpiece
 Edrie Dale Trout
 Narkis Tzoar
 Hiroomi Umezawa
 Erich W. Vogt
 Kameshwar C. Wali
 N. Sanders Wall
 G. King Walters
 Maurice B. Webb
 Marvin John Weber
 Peter P. Wegener
 Harvey E. Wegner
 William A. Wenzel
 Peter J. Westervelt
 Robert G. Wheeler
 Mildred Widgoff
 Thomas A. Wiggins
 Denys Haight Wilkinson
 Richard Frost Wood
 Truman O. Woodruff
 Leo Yaffe
 Gaurang B. Yodh
 Shoichi Yoshikawa

1969

 Abashian Alexander
 Robert Clyde Amme
 Ansel Cochran Anderson
 George Thomson Armstrong
 Anthony Arrott
 Manuel Aven
 John D. Axe
 John N. Bahcall
 A. S. Barker
 Boris W. Batterman
 Gordon Alan Baym
 Everet Hess Beckner
 Hans Bichsel
 Edward G. Bilpuch
 Henry V. Bohm
 Norman Ewart Booth
 Walter E. Bron
 Edmond Brown
 Joseph Callaway
 R. G. Chambers
 Roger Chang
 Chellis Chasman
 Kasturi Lal Chopra
 Robert Edward Chrien
 Nicholas C. Christofilos
 Talbot Albert Chubb
 Richard S. Claassen
 Marvin L. Cohen
 Barnett C. Cook
 Gilbert R. cook
 Jerry A. Cowen
 Herman Z. Cummins
 Richard Winslow Damon
 Tara Prasad Das
 Sheldon Datz
 Wiliam Robert Davis
 Jean-Loup Delcroix
 Samuel Devons
 Edmund Armond Dimarzio
 Douglas J. Donahue
 David H. Douglass
 Joseph Dresner
 Charles B. Duke
 Guy T. Emery
 Leopoldo M. Falicov
 Bruce J. Faraday
 John Gabriel Fetkovich
 Herman Joseph Fink
 Douglas K. Finnemore
 Robert Louis Fleischer
 Peter Fong
 Frank Andrew Franz
 Stanley C. Freden
 Ronald Fuchs
 Andrew Leroy Gardner
 Walter M. Gibson
 Donald Maurice Ginsberg
 David Tobias Goldman
 Ulrich Gonser
 Bernard Goodman
 Gordon L. Goodman
 Andrew Vincent Granato
 Thomas A. Green
 Gareth E. Guest
 Theodore C. Harman
 Sven R. Hartmann
 Eastman N. Hatch
 Alan Jay Heeger
 Volker Heine
 David L. Hendrie
 Leland Edgar Holloway
 William G. Hoover
 John J. Hopfield
 Robert D. Hudson
 Horia Hulubei
 A. Jayaraman
 Harold Johnston
 Leo Philip Kadanoff
 George R. Kalbfleisch
 Walter R. Kane
 Edwin Kashy
 Peter E. Kaus
 David T. Keating
 Bruce Reginald F. Kendall
 William J. Kernan
 John B. Ketterson
 John Killeen
 Ottmar C. Kistner
 Miles Vincent Klein
 Alfred Lande
 Raymond O. Lane
 Simon Larach
 Kenneth E. Lassila
 Carl A. Levinson
 George G. Libowitz
 Max R. Lorenz
 Terry Lee Loucks
 Ralph H. Lovberg
 Malcolm H. MacGregor
 Heinz Maier-Leibnitz
 Edward Raymond Manring
 Hugh J. Martin
 L. F. Mattheiss
 Thomas King McCubbin
 William L. McMillan
 N. David Mermin
 Julian Malcolm Miller
 Knox Millsaps
 Shashanka S. Mitra
 David Campbell Montgomery
 Aram Mooradian
 Joseph Morgan
 Rudolf L. Mossbauer
 Lewis H. Nosanow
 Philippe P. Nozieres
 Robert Francis O'Connell
 Thomas A. O'Halloran
 William J. O'Sullivan
 Felix Edward Obenshain
 Satoshi Ozaki
 Arthur Paskin
 James M. Peek
 Morris L. Perlman
 P. S. Pershan
 William T. Pinkston
 Philip M. Platzman
 Richard E. Prange
 Paul B. Price
 David C. Rahm
 Anant K. Ramdas
 John H. Reisner
 Paul L. Richards
 Sergio Rodriguez
 Paul Roman
 John M. Rowell
 M. Eugene Rudd
 Henri S. Sack
 James A. R. Samson
 Laird Delbert Schearer
 Paul Hermann Scherrer
 Harold W. Schmitt
 Sheldon Schultz
 Richard L. Schwoebel
 Franklin R. Scott
 George M. Seidel
 Bernhard O. Seraphin
 Prithe Paul Singh
 Abraham Sosin
 William O. Statton
 Boris P. Stoicheff
 George Clarck Summerfield
 Harry William Taylor
 Kenneth J. Teegarden
 Vigdor L. Teplitz
 Frank Turkot
 Thomas J. Turner
 Herbert M. Uberall
 Jack Leon Uretsky
 Charles E. Violet
 Seymour H. Vosko
 Kurt Weiser
 N. Richard Werthamer
 R. Stephen White
 Calvin Wong
 John M. Worlock
 Philip J. Wyatt
 Avivi Israel Yavin

1970

 Turner Alfrey
 Thomas Lee Bailey
 Bruce H. Billings
 Arnold L. Bloom
 Martin G. Broadhurst
 Philip G. Burke
 Joseph Cheng-Yih Chen
 Richard D. Deslattes
 Gordan H. Dunn
 Adi Eisenberg
 Eldon Earl Ferguson
 George B. Field
 Traugott E. Fischer
 Murray Geller
 Forrest R. Gilmore
 Martin Goldstein
 Laszlo J. Gutay
 William Happer
 John W. Hooper
 George Samuel Hurst
 Frederick R. Innes
 Mitio Inokuti
 George D. Kahl
 Frederick Kaufman
 Hans Kleinpoppen
 Manfred O. Krause
 Chris E. Kuyatt
 Frederick W. Lampe
 Robert F. Landel
 John I. Lauritzen
 George M. Lawrence
 Kenneth R. Lea
 William C. Martin
 J. William McGowan
 H. Harvey Michels
 Lyman Mower
 Earle E. Muschlitz
 Lawrence E. Nielsen
 Richard M. Noyes
 Thomas F. O'Malley
 Stephan Ormonde
 Hendrik J. Oskam
 James R. Peterson
 Roger S. Porter
 Darrell H. Reneker
 S. Peter Rosen
 Arthur L. Schmeltekopf
 Arnold L. Smith
 Daniel J. Sperber
 Richard M. Stern
 Aaron Temkin
 Kip S. Thorne
 Robert Ullman
 John F. Waymouth
 Benjamin Widom
 Wolfgang Lothar Wiese
 Bernhard Wunderlich
 Norman J. Zabusky
 Richard Zare

1971

 
 Louis W. Anderson
 David Barlett
 Paul A. Beck
 Arthur I. Bienenstock
 Howard K. Birnbaum
 Thomas H. Blewitt
 Charles D. Bowman
 F. Paul Brady
 Alan D. Brailsford
 John A. Brinkman
 James C. Browne
 Curtis G. Callan
 Gerald G. Comisar
 John Cooper
 Roger E. DeWames
 Stanley Deser
 James R. Durig
 
 Lothar W. Frommhold
 Solomon Gartenhaus
 Alfred E. Glassgold
 Eugene Haddad
 Lawrence A. Harris
 Claude W. Horton
 Hugh P. Kelly
 Leonard Kleinman
 Martin Lessen
 Theodore E. Madey
 Lloyd Godfrey Mann
 Daniel Mattis
 Marcus T. McEllistrem
 Robert J. McNeal
 Harry L. Morrison
 Yuval Ne'eman
 Raymond L. Orbach
 Albert W. Overhauser
 Robert L. Park
 Francis Pichanik
 Francis Pipkin
 John R. Reitz
 Donald C. Reynolds
 Thor N. Rhodin
 Howard Schnitzer
 Eric Sheldon
 Robert E. Stickney
 Lynwood W. Swanson
 Robert W. Terhune
 Steven Weinberg
 Charles A. Wert
 Harry I. West

See also
 List of American Physical Society Fellows (1972–1997)
 List of American Physical Society Fellows (1998–2010)
 List of American Physical Society Fellows (2011–)

References 

1921